"The Glory of Love" is a song that was written by Billy Hill and recorded  in 1936 by Benny Goodman. Goodman's version was a number one pop hit.  The song has been recorded by many artists. It was the signature theme of the 1967 film Guess Who's Coming to Dinner, performed by nightclub singer Jacqueline Fontaine on camera, as well as over the opening and closing credits. Bette Midler included the song in the film Beaches (1988) and it appears on the soundtrack.

Charts

Weekly charts

The Five Keys version

In 1951, R&B vocal group, The Five Keys, had their biggest R&B hit with their version of the song, hitting number one on the R&B chart for four non-consecutive weeks.

Otis Redding version

In 1967, Otis Redding recorded a cover version for his 1968 album, The Dock of the Bay. Redding's cover became a top 20 hit and reached number 19 on the Billboard R&B Songs chart and number 60 on the Billboard Hot 100.

Charts

Weekly charts

Other versions
 Big Bill Broonzy (1957) - also used in the soundtrack of 2003 film Intolerable Cruelty
 Rosemary Clooney - My Buddy (1983)
 Billy Cotton and His Band (1936)
 Vic Damone - for his album Why Can't I Walk Away (1968)
 Jimmy Durante - for his album Hello Young Lovers (1965)
 Jacqueline Fontaine - featured prominently in the film Guess Who's Coming to Dinner (1967)
 Peggy Lee - Jump for Joy (1958)
 Dean Martin - included in the album Dean Martin Sings Songs from "The Silencers" (1966)
 John Martyn - included in the album Inside Out (1973)
 Bette Midler - included in the soundtrack of Beaches (1988)
 Paul McCartney - Kisses on the Bottom (2012)
 Tom Rush - included on his 1968 album The Circle Game (1968)
 Kay Starr - for her album Rockin' with Kay (1958).
 The Velvetones (1957) - used in the soundtrack of Casino (1995)
 Veronica Osorio and Alden Ehrenreich - used in the Coen brothers' film Hail, Caesar! (2016)
 Imelda May - used in the film Blithe Spirit (2020)
 Isabelle Fuhrman - used in the film Orphan (2009)
 The Andrews Sisters (1950)

References

1936 songs
1951 singles
Benny Goodman songs
Otis Redding songs
Songs written by Billy Hill (songwriter)
Paul McCartney songs